The fourth season of Psych originally aired in the United States on USA Network from August 7, 2009 to March 10, 2010. It consisted of 16 episodes. James Roday, Dulé Hill, Timothy Omundson, Maggie Lawson, Corbin Bernsen and Kirsten Nelson reprised their roles as the main characters. James Roday portrayed Shawn Spencer, a fake psychic detective who periodically consults for the Santa Barbara police department. A DVD of the season was released on July 13, 2010.

Production
Steve Franks, creator of the series, returned for the fourth season as showrunner. The theme song, "I Know, You Know" by The Friendly Indians, continued to be used, though it was edited twice: in "Bollywood Homicide", the song was given a Bollywood theme with the lyrics sung in Hindi, while Boyz II Men performed an a cappella version for "High Top Fade Out".

Mel Damski returned to direct four episodes, while Stephen Surjik returned for three and Steve Franks directed two. Returning to direct one episode each were John Badham, Jay Chandrasekhar, Michael McMurray, James Roday and Matt Shakman. Andrew Bernstein and Tawnia McKiernan each joined the show to direct one episode.

Steve Franks wrote five episodes, while Andy Berman wrote four and Kell Cahoon, Saladin K. Patterson and James Roday wrote three. Returning for two episodes each were writers Tim Meltreger and Anupam Nigam. Bill Callahan and Todd Harthan joined the writing team, with Callahan writing three episodes, and Harthan writing one.

Cast

James Roday continued to play fake psychic detective Shawn Spencer. Burton "Gus" Guster returned, portrayed by Dulé Hill. Timothy Omundson returned as Head Detective Carlton "Lassie" Lassiter, while Maggie Lawson continued to portray Juliet "Jules" O'Hara. Corbin Bernsen was kept on as Henry Spencer. Kirsten Nelson continued in her role as SBPD Chief Karen Vick.

Sage Brocklebank continued to portray Officer Buzz McNab. Liam James and Carlos McCullers II continued in their roles as young Shawn and Gus, respectively. Rachael Leigh Cook appeared in four episodes as Abigail Lytar. Kurt Fuller made his Psych debut as Woody the Coroner, who shares many character traits with Shawn, in three episodes. Ally Sheedy made her second appearance as Mr. Yang, the deranged alleged killer who has been institutionalized, and her appearance marked the first time a villain on the show appeared in more than one episode. Jimmi Simpson made his final appearance as the living Mary Lightly (though he returned post-death a few times), and Christopher Turner entered as the chaotic, mysterious Mr. Yin, Yang's other, more dangerous and deranged, half. Cary Elwes made his first appearance as art thief Pierre Desperaux, and Peter Oldring and Ed Lauter appeared as Canadian officers. Ray Wise made his first appearance as Father Westley. Jaleel White made his first appearance as Gus's former bandmate. Additionally, almost every episode featured a prominent guest star. Among them were Christine Baranski, Jim Beaver, Josh Braaten, James Brolin, John Cena, Jay Chandrasekhar, Tim Conlon, Bruce Davison, Cullen Douglas, Deanna Dunagan, Miguel Ferrer, Azita Ghanizada, Ernie Grunwald, John Hawkes, Sandra Hess, Michael Hogan, Scott Holroyd, Steve Howey, Stacy Keibler, Alexandra Krosney, Stephan Lang, Joshua Malina, David Naughton, Judd Nelson, Larisa Oleynik, Robert Patrick, Sendhil Ramamurthy, Lisa Ray, Michael Rooker, Jeri Ryan, Chris Sarandon, Sarah Shahi, Craig Sheffer, Kenan Thompson, Tony Todd, Beverley Turner, Arnold Vosloo and Thomas F. Wilson.

Episodes

References

Psych
2009 American television seasons
2010 American television seasons